Wenzel Wiesner (1877-1957) was a mayor of Green Bay, Wisconsin.

Biography

Mayor Wenzel Wiesner 1921 - 1927
Wenzel E. Wiesner was born on April 18, 1877, in Kewaunee County.
He married Emma Drabonzel in Kewaunee in 1899. They had two children, a son (Wenzel E. Wiesner II) and daughter (Olga Wiesner).
Wenzel served as alderman in Kewaunee, was the first secretary of the municipal light plant, and served as Sheriff of Kewaunee County. The family moved to Green Bay in 1911.

Career
Wiesner's term as mayor of Green Bay, from 1921 to 1927, was highlighted by the organization of the Water Department and the Park Department, the motorization of the fire department, mechanization of street cleaning, and the installation of the first electric traffic signal at Washington and East Walnut Streets.

Wenzel was influential in keeping the Packers in Green Bay early in their career. Using his influence as mayor, he was able to get the team back into Joannes Park after they had spent two years playing at Bellevue Park far out on Main Street. He served on the Packer Board of Directors for a number of years and was very active in all their affairs in that period. He was also an influential supporter of baseball in Green Bay, particularly in the Green Sox era.
 
Washington Street, 1918, looking north from Cherry Street. Armistice Day.
Neville Public Museum of Brown County

He served the city under the old commission form of government, which included the mayor and two councilmen. He left office in 1927 when the commission form was voted out. He was succeeded by James H. McGillin.

He was a member of the Vocational School Board, Board of Education, County Board, and President of the Federated Trades Council for sixteen years.

He died in 1957 at his home at 521 South Clay Street following a long illness and is buried in Woodlawn Cemetery.

References

People from Kewaunee County, Wisconsin
Mayors of Green Bay, Wisconsin
Wisconsin city council members
1877 births
1957 deaths
People from Kewaunee, Wisconsin